Panza is a town in Italy
Panza or La Panza may also refer to:

People
 Carlo Panza, Italian sports shooter
 Federigo Panza (1633–1703), Italian painter.
 Giuseppe Panza (1923–2010), art collector
 Sancho Panza, a fictional character in the novel Don Quixote, Don Quixote's sidekick
Things
 Panza, another name for menudo (soup)
Places
 La Panza, California
 La Panza Range

See also
Catherine Samba-Panza (born 1956), interim President of the Central African Republic from 2014 to 2016
Pansa (disambiguation)
Panzo (disambiguation)